The 2002–03 season was Port Vale's 91st season of football in the English Football League, and third successive season (40th overall) in the Second Division. Another poor season, Brian Horton's side avoided relegation with a seventeenth-place finish. Vale exited both the FA Cup and the League Cup at the First Round with defeats to Crewe Alexandra, and reached the Area Quarter-finals of the League Trophy. Financial issues were at the forefront in the minds of Vale fans, as the club entered administration in December. After a successful bid, Bill Bratt's Valiant 2001 group won control of the club, taking the club out of administration.

Overview

Second Division
The pre-season saw Brian Horton make several free signings: Jon McCarthy (Birmingham City); Brett Angell (Rushden & Diamonds); Ian Brightwell (Walsall); Phil Charnock (Crewe Alexandra); Sam Collins (Bury); and Mark Boyd (Newcastle United). Midfielder Dean Keates had a trial at the club over the summer, but was not offered a contract.

The season started poorly with four straight defeats and only one goal scored from open play, causing fans to barrack Horton. Their form changed with a 1–0 win over Wigan Athletic at the JJB Stadium – the first in a sequence of five consecutive victories. Following this run victories were sparse for the Vale, and they picked up just four league victories until the beginning of March. The club agreed to sell Stephen McPhee to Wigan Athletic for £300,000, though the deal fell through over personal terms. In October, Lee Ashcroft arrived on loan from Wigan Athletic. Meanwhile, Jon McCarthy was released, and signed with Doncaster Rovers. The next month Brett Angell also departed after rejecting a new deal with the club, and instead joined Queens Park Rangers. A mini-revival began in the new year, as Vale were unbeaten in their three January league games. In February, defender Peter Clarke arrived on a three-month loan deal from Everton. Adrian Littlejohn also joined the club on a monthly contract, having left Lincoln City. There was a turnaround in form following a 1–0 win over Blackpool on 8 March, as eighteen points from the final twelve games of the season were enough to see off the fan's fears of relegation. Horton still remained unpopular with some sections of the Vale's supporters.

They finished in seventeenth place with 53 points, just five points above Cheltenham Town in the relegation zone. They finished 33 points and 15 places behind Crewe, who were promoted as runners-up. The end of season table was unusual, in that 15 points separated 7th and 8th, whilst 17 points separated 8th and 21st. Marc Bridge-Wilkinson was the club's top-scorer with just nine goals in all competitions.

At the end of the season a number of players left the club on free transfers: Matt Carragher (Macclesfield Town); Paul Byrne (Barry Town); Phil Charnock (Bury); Sean McClare (Rochdale); John Durnin (Accrington Stanley); and Rae Ingram (Bangor City).

Finances, administration & a change of ownership
Talks of Bell selling the club circulated at the start of the season, as Staffordshire Police were forced to write off £100,000 worth of debt. Meanwhile, Marketing executive Terry Smith resigned after just six weeks in the job. Bell told the press that the Lorne Street stand would be open at the start of the season, though work never got going on the project. Director Jim Lloyd resigned in September, leaving the club with just Bell and two directors (only one of whom was allowed to vote; Bell had the casting vote in the event of a tie). The club's financial crisis came to a head in the season, the club £2.4 million in debt and posting £500,000 a year losses. On 25 November, Bell put his shares up for sale at £10 each.

The club entered administration on 16 December, with £600,000 owed to Inland Revenue and the Customs & Excise; Birmingham-based administration firm Poppleton & Appleby took control. Assistant manager Mark Grew and Ray Williams were both laid off in order to save money. The club approached millionaire pop star and Vale fan Robbie Williams, who rejected the opportunity to invest in the club. Rumours circulated of a possible merger with rivals Stoke City and a ground-share at the Britannia Stadium, fuelled by the belief that a 'mystery bidder' was in fact the Icelandic owners of Stoke City. Stoke Holdings, the Icelandic company which owned Stoke City, offered Bill Bell £50,000 to buy his debt and thereby take control of the club by bypassing the administrators; however Bell rejected the offer. Valiant2001 eventually agreed to rent the club shop off Bell as an incitement for him to accept their offer (his vote was needed as he was the club's biggest creditor). The administrators received a number of bids for the club, and received interest from Mo Chaudry (owner of WaterWorld), Summerbank Management (Tunstall based consultancy firm), and property developing duo Steve Ball and Iain McIntosh. A late bid from Gianni Paladini seemed likely to succeed, however Bill Bratt's 'Valiant 2001' fan-based consortium's bid was accepted in March, and the group took control the following month. The group had had a £1 million bid rejected by Bell the previous year. The total cost of administration was £255,000, and Bratt said "It has been a ride of terror".

In May, the club announced a new two year £200,000 shirt sponsorship deal with local mobile phone company Tricell, ending ten years of sponsorship from Tunstall Assurance. The new board also appointed former player Andy Porter as youth coach, and got the club's transfer embargo lifted in July.

Cup competitions
In the FA Cup, Vale were knocked out by nearby Crewe Alexandra with a Dean Ashton goal.

In the League Cup, Crewe made the first of their three visits to Vale Park (all of which they won), and advanced with a 2–0 victory, both goals scored by Rodney Jack.

In the League Trophy, Vale advanced through the opening rounds with home wins over Hull City and Chesterfield (after a penalty shootout). In the Northern Section Quarter-Finals they faced Shrewsbury Town at Gay Meadow, and lost 2–1.

League table

Results
Port Vale's score comes first

Football League Second Division

Results by matchday

Matches

FA Cup

League Cup

League Trophy

Player statistics

Appearances

Top scorers

Transfers

Transfers in

Transfers out

Loans in

References
Specific

General
Soccerbase

Port Vale F.C. seasons
Port Vale